Ellbach is a river of Saarland, Germany. It is a tributary of the Saar and is 8 kilometers long.

See also
List of rivers of Saarland

Rivers of Saarland
Rivers of Germany